Dhoolpet is part of the Old City of Hyderabad India,  partly inhabited by people who migrated from Uttar Pradesh during the Nizam rule.

The area is well-known for illegal bootlegging. The Jummerat Bazaar (Thursday Market) is a flea market held every Thursday in Dhoolpet.

Transport
Dhoolpet, situated near Afzalgunj, is connected by TSRTC buses (80 from Afzalgunj and 2J from Sec'bad).
The closest MMTS train station is Uppuguda and railway station is Nampally.

References

Neighbourhoods in Hyderabad, India